The 1956 United States men's Olympic basketball team competed in the 1956 Summer Olympics in Melbourne, Australia from November 22 to December 1, 1956. The team was led by Bill Russell, who averaged 14.1 points per game. Team USA won the Olympic Gold medal, beating their opponents by an average of 53.5 points, an unsurpassed average margin of victory in Olympic basketball.

Roster

1956 USA results
 
 beat , 98–40
 beat , 101–29
 beat , 121–53
 beat , 85–44
 beat , 113–51
 beat , 85–55
 beat , 101–38
 beat , 89–55

USA record was 8–0

Stats

1956 Olympic Games final standings

1.  (8–0)
2.  (5–3)
3.  (6–2)
4.  (5–3)
5.  (5–3)
6.  (3–4)
7.  (4–4)
8.  (2–5)
9.  (5–2)
10.  (3–4)
11.  (5–3)
12.  (2–5)
13.  (2–5)
14.  (1–6)
15.  (0–7)

See also
Basketball at the 1956 Summer Olympics

References

External links
 USA Basketball, official site

United States at the Olympic men's basketball tournament
United
olympic